Brian Reade is a journalist and author who writes a weekly opinion column for the Daily Mirror. He was born in Wavertree and grew up in Huyton.

He began his journalism career working on the Reading Evening Post in 1980 and became a columnist on the Liverpool Echo in 1990 before moving to the Mirror in 1994.

In 2001 he was named Columnist of the Year at the British Press Awards and was Highly Commended in the same category in 2014. In 2004 he won Sports Columnist of the Year and in 2013 he was awarded the Cudlipp Award for Journalistic Excellence after two decades campaigning for justice for the Hillsborough families. In 2018 The Press Awards named Reade Feature Writer of The Year.

In the aftermath of the 2004 US election in which George W Bush was re-elected for a further term, he penned a damning indictment of Bush and the US electorate, God Help America.

In 2007, a column in the Daily Mirror by Reade which likened Lord Green and his organisation MigrationWatch UK to the Ku Klux Klan and the Nazi Party led to Green successfully suing for costs and damages.

In 2008, he became a presenter on radio station City Talk 105.9 and released his first book, entitled 43 Years with the Same Bird, documenting his life spent following Liverpool F.C.

In 2011, he released a book investigating corruption in football, An Epic Swindle, which made The Sunday Times best-seller list. In 2021 Reade wrote a third book Diamonds In The Mud about working-class heroes, with all the proceeds going to The Casa social justice hub in Liverpool.

Notes 

Living people
British male journalists
Journalists from Liverpool
1957 births
British republicans